Ster Cinemas S.A. was a Greek chain of cinemas. It had sites across Greece.

The company
Ster Cinemas was a Greek company, a subsidiary of Audio Visual Enterprises S.A. (Vardinogiannis group of companies). The Ster Cinemas group operated near large Greek urban centres (Athens, Thessaloniki, Patras, Larissa and Chania).

Sites
Cinemas operated under the Ster Cinemas brand include (all closed or open as Odeon):

Greece
 Ster Ilion in Ilion Athens 8 screens & 1 Summer (1 3D)     
 Ster Macedonia in Thessaloniki 11 screens (2 3D)
 Ster Pantheon Plaza in Larissa 3 screens (1 3D)
 Ster Veso Mare in Patras 8 screens (2 3D) 
 Ster Mega Place in Chania, Greece 3 screens (1 3D)

Ster Cinemas also operated the following sites, until they were sold to Cineplexx International in 2011.

Montenegro
 Ster Montenegro, 5 screens (closed, now Cineplexx)

Serbia
 Ster Cinemas Beograd, 7 screens

References

Cinemas and movie theaters chains
Cinema of Greece